is a former Japanese football player.

Playing career
Muramatsu was born in Shizuoka on April 10, 1982. He joined J1 League club Shimizu S-Pulse from youth team in 2001. He debuted in 2002 and his opportunity to play as defensive midfielder increased until 2004. However he could hardly play in the match 2005. In 2006, he moved to J2 League club Vegalta Sendai. However he could hardly play in the match. In 2007, he moved to J2 club Mito HollyHock. He became a regular player as defensive midfielder. In 2010, he moved to newly was promoted to J2 League club, Giravanz Kitakyushu. However he could not play many matches. In 2011, he moved to FC Gifu reserve team. He retired end of 2012 season.

Club statistics

References

External links

1982 births
Living people
Association football people from Shizuoka Prefecture
Japanese footballers
J1 League players
J2 League players
Shimizu S-Pulse players
Vegalta Sendai players
Mito HollyHock players
Giravanz Kitakyushu players
Association football midfielders